The Angola national football team has represented Angola in international association football since 1976. The Angolan Football Federation (FAF) was founded in 1979 and became a member of the Fédération Internationale de Football Association (FIFA) one year later. However, the team had already played its first international match on 8 February 1976, suffering a 3–2 defeat to Congo in a friendly game.

Players

References

 
 
Association football player non-biographical articles
Lists of Angola international footballers